Shkolnaya railway station is a railway station located near Sestroretsk (suburb of Saint Petersburg), Russia.

It was built by the Joint-stock company of the Prinorskaya St.-Peterburg-Sestroretsk railway.

References

Railway stations in Saint Petersburg